The 2019 IMSA Prototype Challenge is the fourteenth season of the IMSA Lites series and its successors and the third season as the IMSA Prototype Challenge. It began on 5 January at Daytona International Speedway, and concluded on 11 October at Road Atlanta. The IMSA Prototype Challenge series is for future IMSA WeatherTech SportsCar Championship drivers and veteran drivers alike. Entering its 14th season, IMSA Prototype Challenge shifts to a single-class, endurance race format in 2019 with six races held on North America’s most premier road courses. The series will continue to feature the global-spec LMP3 prototypes. The endurance format pairs two-drivers per car in a six race season.

Series news
NBC Sports Group took over from Fox Sports as the series' official broadcaster.
Michelin became the new official tire supplier of the series, following the departure of Continental Tire at the end of 2018.
The Mazda Prototype Challenge (MPC) class was discontinued at the end of 2018.

Calendar

Race schedule
The 2019 schedule was released on 2 August 2018 and features six rounds.

Calendar changes
The round at Barber Motorsports Park was replaced with a round at the Mid-Ohio Sports Car Course.
The rounds at Daytona International Speedway and Canadian Tire Motorsport Park had their race lengths increased from 1 hour 45 minutes to 3 hours.

Entry List
All teams use the Nissan VK50VE 5.0L V8 engines.

Results

Race Results

Points system

Drivers' Championship

Overall

Bronze Cup

Team's Championship

References

External links
 Prototype Challenge Website
 IMSA Website

2019
2019 in American motorsport